Marland Heights Park and Margaret Manson Weir Memorial Pool is a historic park and swimming pool  located at Weirton, Hancock County, West Virginia, United States. The Park was dedicated in July 1934 and is a contributing site. It has two contributing structures and one building; the Margaret Manson Weir Memorial Pool, a large wood timber and stone picnic shelter, and a tool shed.  The ovoid-shaped pool was built in 1934, with funds from the David Weir Estate and maintenance support from the Weirton Steel Corporation.  The main entrance to the pool features Art Deco style design features.

It was listed on the National Register of Historic Places in 1993.

References

Art Deco architecture in West Virginia
Buildings and structures completed in 1934
Buildings and structures in Hancock County, West Virginia
Municipal parks in West Virginia
National Register of Historic Places in Hancock County, West Virginia
Parks on the National Register of Historic Places in West Virginia
Protected areas established in 1934
1934 establishments in West Virginia